This is a list of seasons completed by the Vegas Golden Knights of the National Hockey League. This list documents the records and playoff results for all seasons the Golden Knights have completed in the NHL since their inception in 2017.

Table key

Year by year

1 The 2019–20 NHL season was suspended on March 12, 2020 due to the COVID-19 pandemic.
2 The 2020–21 NHL season was shortened to 56 games due to the COVID-19 pandemic.

All-time records

References

National Hockey League team seasons
Vegas Golden Knights
Events in Paradise, Nevada
Seasons